Gustav Niklas Henriksson (born 3 February 1998) is a Swedish professional footballer who plays for Elfsborg.

Club career

Grebbestads IF
Henriksson began his football career with hometown club Grebbestads IF. He made 23 appearances and scored one goal for the first team between 2012 and 2014.

IF Elfsborg
In the summer of 2014, Henriksson moved to IF Elfsborg, where he would join their youth academy. In August 2018, he was promoted to the first team. On 26 September 2018, Henriksson made his Allsvenskan debut in a 1–0 win over Hammarby IF.

Wolfsberger AC
On 1 February 2021, Henriksson signed with Austrian Football Bundesliga club Wolfsberger AC. He scored his first goal in his Bundesliga debut, a header, as his club beat Admira Wacker Mödling 2–1.

Return to Elfsborg
On 7 January 2022, Henriksson returned to Elfsborg on a four-year contract.

References

External links 
 
  (archive)

1998 births
Living people
Swedish footballers
Association football defenders
IF Elfsborg players
Wolfsberger AC players
Allsvenskan players
Austrian Football Bundesliga players
Swedish expatriate footballers
Expatriate footballers in Austria
Swedish expatriate sportspeople in Austria
People from Tanum Municipality
Sportspeople from Västra Götaland County